At least two ships of the French Navy have been named Somali:

 , an  launched in 1917 and struck in 1935.
 , a  launched as USS Somali and transferred to France in 1944. She was renamed Arago in 1968 and returned to the USA in 1972.

French Navy ship names